Papabile (also , ;  ;  or "able to be pope") is an unofficial Italian term first coined by Vaticanologists and now used internationally in many languages to describe a Catholic man, in practice always a cardinal, who is thought a likely or possible candidate to be elected pope. In some cases the cardinals will choose a papabile candidate. Among the papabili cardinals who have been elected pope are Eugenio Pacelli (Pius XII), Giovanni Battista Montini (Paul VI), and Joseph Ratzinger (Benedict XVI). However, at times the College of Cardinals elects a man who was not considered papabile by most Vatican watchers. In recent years those who were elected pope though not considered papabile include John XXIII, John Paul I, John Paul II. There is a saying among Vaticanologists: "He who enters the conclave as pope, leaves it as a cardinal." This is a popular proverb in Italy as well, indicating one should never be too sure of oneself.

The list of papabili changes as cardinals age. For instance, Carlo Maria Martini was thought to be papabile until he retired from his see upon reaching 75 years of age.

The term papabile is at least as old as the 15th century, since it is found in the Catholicon Anglicum.

In Italian, the word papabile is also used in non-Church contexts referring to short list candidates, i.e. those who, among the available candidates, are most likely to get elected or appointed to a specific position.

Papabili elected pope
 Francesco Saverio Castiglioni (elected as Pius VIII in 1829)
 Gioachino Pecci (elected as Leo XIII in 1878)
 Giacomo della Chiesa (elected as Benedict XV in 1914)
 Eugenio Pacelli (elected as Pius XII in 1939)
 Giovanni Battista Montini (elected as Paul VI in 1963)
 Joseph Ratzinger (elected as Benedict XVI in 2005)
 Jorge Mario Bergoglio (elected as Francis in 2013)

Papabili not elected
Being seen as papabile, however, is no guarantee of election, and is sometimes seen as a handicap. (Although the following candidates were widely discussed as candidates publicly, the actual vote results described below are frequently based on rumours and sourced, if at all, from off-the-record reports of individual cardinals.)
 Giuseppe Siri was widely expected to be elected pope in the 1958 and 1963 conclaves and continued to be a prime contender in both 1978 conclaves.  On the first of these occasions, Angelo Roncalli, an utterly unexpected choice, was elected and became Pope John XXIII.
Giovanni Benelli was widely expected to be elected pope in both the August and October 1978 conclaves.  In fact he was defeated in both (narrowly the second time).  In August, a candidate few saw as papabile, Albino Luciani, was elected and became Pope John Paul I–with the support of Benelli himself.  In October, another such candidate, Karol Wojtyła, was elected as John Paul II.
 Rafael Merry del Val was a widely considered candidate during the conclaves of 1914 and 1922 which eventually elected Benedict XV and Pius XI respectively, although he never garnered enough votes to be in serious contention.
 Bartolomeo Pacca – experienced diplomat under Pius VII, he was a candidate in 1823 and favored to win in 1829 but was vetoed by France. Cardinal Castiglioni was elected as Pius VIII.
 Emmanuele de Gregorio - expected to succeed Leo XII and Pius VIII, but never did.
 Mariano Rampolla – Leo XIII's Secretary of State. He was headed for victory in the 1903 conclave only to be vetoed by Kraków Cardinal Jan Puzyna de Kosielsko on behalf of Austro-Hungarian Emperor Franz Joseph I. With Rampolla blocked, Giuseppe Sarto was elected and became Pius X. One of Pius X's first acts was to abolish the rights of states to veto.
 Carlo Maria Martini – Jesuit, biblical exegete, Archbishop of Milan from 1980 to 2002. Considered to be the most likely successor to John Paul II for much of the 1980s and 1990s but was already suffering from Parkinson's disease by the time the 2005 papal conclave was convened.
 Francis Arinze – speculated by some media reports as a highly favoured successor to John Paul II but did not gain a substantial number of votes in the 2005 papal conclave.

Papabili at the 2013 conclave
The following cardinals, as noted in the cited references, were also considered papabili at the 2013 conclave, which elected Cardinal Jorge Mario Bergoglio, who took the name Francis.
  Angelo Bagnasco, Archbishop of Genoa
  Timothy M. Dolan, Archbishop of New York
  Péter Erdő, Archbishop of Esztergom-Budapest
  Seán Patrick O'Malley, Archbishop of Boston
  Marc Ouellet, Prefect of the Congregation for Bishops
  Gianfranco Ravasi, President of the Pontifical Council for Culture
  Leonardo Sandri, Prefect of the Congregation for the Oriental Churches
  Odilo Pedro Scherer, Archbishop of São Paulo
  Christoph Schönborn, Archbishop of Vienna
  Angelo Scola, Archbishop of Milan
  Luis Antonio Tagle, Archbishop of Manila
  Peter Turkson, President of the Pontifical Council for Justice and Peace

Papabili in future conclave - The Next Pope (2020)
Edward Pentin, Rome correspondent for the National Catholic Register, released a book in August 2020 entitled The Next Pope: The Leading Cardinal Candidates, listing 19 Cardinals he considered papabili for a future conclave after Pope Francis. Four of the 19, Wilfrid Napier, Gianfranco Ravasi, Angelo Scola and Angelo Bagnasco, turned 80 in 2021, 2022 and 2023 and thus will not be part of a future conclave (but could still be elected pope). Several others are due to reach the age of 80 in the next couple of years. The nineteen listed, and their current ages, are;

Non-papabili elected pope

 Barnaba Chiaramonti (elected as Pius VII in 1800)
 Annibale della Genga (elected as Leo XII in 1823)
 Bartolomeo Alberto Mauro Cappellari (elected as Gregory XVI in 1831)
 Giuseppe Melchiorre Sarto (elected as Pius X in 1903)
 Achille Ratti (elected as Pius XI in 1922)
 Angelo Giuseppe Roncalli (elected as John XXIII in 1958)
 Albino Luciani (elected as John Paul I in 1978)
 Karol Wojtyła (elected as John Paul II in 1978)

Pope John Paul I predicted Cardinal Wojtyła – the future John Paul II – would succeed him, and Cardinal Jean-Marie Villot predicted in May 1978 that only Wojtyła could gain the support of two-thirds of the cardinal electors, but was not widely considered papabile because he was not Italian. As of 1978, no non-Italian had been elected Pope since the 1522 conclave that chose the short-lived Dutch Pope Adrian VI.

See also
 Conclave capitulation
 Elective monarchy
 Holy See
 Index of Vatican City-related articles
 List of papal elections
 Papal appointment
 Papal primacy
 Papal conclave (2005; 2013)
 Papal coronation
 Terna, a list of the final three candidates to possibly be named bishop of a diocese, or another post that could only be filled by a bishop, in the appointment of Catholic bishops
 Short list, an analogous secular concept

Notes

References

Bibliography

News articles

External links

 Papabili list for 2009 at "Popes-and-Papacy"
 Site ranking potential papabili
  BBC News: Bets open on Benedict's successor

Election of the Pope
Italian words and phrases